57 (fifty-seven) is the natural number following 56 and preceding 58.

In mathematics 
Fifty-seven is the sixteenth discrete semiprime, and the fourth discrete bi-prime pair with 58. It is a Blum integer since its two prime factors are both Gaussian primes. It is also an icosagonal (20-gonal) number and a repdigit in base-7 (111).

57 is the fourth Leyland number, as it can be written in the form:

57 is the number of compositions of 10 into distinct parts.

With an aliquot sum of 23, fifty-seven is the first composite member of the 23-aliquot tree.

57 is the seventh fine number, equivalently the number of ordered rooted trees with seven nodes having root of even degree.

In geometry, there are:
57 non-prismatic uniform star polyhedra in 3-space, including four Kepler-Poinsot star polyhedra that are regular. 
57 vertices and hemi-dodecahedral facets in the 57-cell, a 4-dimensional abstract regular polytope. 
57 uniform prismatic 5-polytopes in the fifth dimension based on four different finite prismatic families, and inclusive of one special non-Wythoffian figure: the grand antiprism prism.
57 uniform prismatic 6-polytopes in the sixth dimension, as prisms of all non-prismatic uniform 5-polytopes.

The split Lie algebra E has a 57-dimensional Heisenberg algebra as its nilradical, and the smallest possible homogeneous space for E8 is also 57-dimensional.

57 lies between prime numbers 53 and 61, which are the only two prime numbers less than 71 that do not divide the order of any sporadic group, inclusive of the six pariahs. 71, the twentieth prime number, is the largest supersingular prime that divides the largest of these groups while 57, on the other hand, is the fortieth composite number whose sum of divisors σ(57) is 80 and averages 20.

Although fifty-seven is not prime, it is jokingly known as the "Grothendieck prime" after a story in which mathematician Alexander Grothendieck supposedly gave it as an example of a particular prime number. This story is repeated in Part 2 of a biographical article on Grothendieck in
Notices of the American Mathematical Society.

In science 
The atomic number of lanthanum (La), the first of the lanthanides

Astronomy 

 Messier object M57, a magnitude 9.5 planetary nebula in the constellation Lyra, also known as the Ring Nebula
 The New General Catalogue object NGC 57, an elliptical galaxy in the constellation Pisces.

In fiction and media

In films 
 Passenger 57, a film starring Wesley Snipes
 In the movie Contagion, Vaccine #57 successfully protects the lab monkey from infection.
 The Terminal (2004) starring Tom Hanks. There are 57 members of the jazz band that Viktor Navorski carries a picture of with him.
 in the movie Eraser (1996), the weapons  trade operation took place at the Baltimore Docks, Pier 57.

In games 
 In the game Hollow Knight, a character named Zote the Mighty has 57 precepts, all of which offer rather humorous, lackluster, or completely bad advice to the player.

In literature 
 In Rudyard Kipling's short story "The Man Who Would Be King", the character Peachy states: "This business is our Fifty-Seven" after he and Daniel are discovered to be men, not gods.  This alludes to the Indian Rebellion in 1857, or India's First War of Independence, against British Rule.
 B'hrian Bloodaxe, the first Low King of the dwarfs, killed 57 trolls in the legendary Battle of Koom Valley on Discworld (a fictional world created by author Terry Pratchett)

In radio 
 The Fabulous 57 were disk jockeys on WMCA 570 Radio, New York City during the 1960s

In television 
 Agent 57 is the name of the master of disguise in the television series Danger Mouse
 Exit 57, a sketch comedy show that aired on Comedy Central from 1995 to 1996 featured Stephen Colbert, Paul Dinello, Jodi Lennon, Mitch Rouse and Amy Sedaris
 The 57th Overlanders is a fictional brigade mentioned in the television series Firefly.
 West 57 was a weekly news-magazine show on CBS, 1985–89, hosted by Meredith Vieira
 The Cartoon Network program Metalocalypse has a fictional television station WHYK-57
 The Robot Chicken sketch "Pluto Nash Day" notes that 57 people at 20th Century Fox Studios died amid rioting and suicide
 A Robot Chicken parody of the NBC TV series Heroes uses the episode title "Chapter Fifty-seven: Uncle Glen"
 Studio 57 was a dramatic anthology series in 1954, starring Brian Keith and Carolyn Jones

In food 
Heinz 57, a brand of sauce, and the number of varieties of foods claimed to be produced by the H.J. Heinz Company

In music
 "Incident on 57th Street", a song by Bruce Springsteen and the E Street Band, from their 1973 album, The Wild, the Innocent and the E Street Shuffle
 "57 Channels (And Nothin' On)", a song by Bruce Springsteen, from his 1992 album Human Touch
 "57", the name of a song by Biffy Clyro on their 2002 debut album, Blackened Sky
 Shure SM57, considered the workhorse of recording microphones

In organizations
The number of the French department Moselle

In places
Carnegie Hall is on West 57th Street in New York City

In transportation and vessels

The model name of a Maybach car
USS Lake Champlain (CG 57), a Ticonderoga class cruiser in the United States Navy and the third ship to be named Lake Champlain

In other fields
The code for international direct dial phone calls to Colombia is 57.
The number of the laps of the Bahrain Grand Prix.

See also 
 List of highways numbered 57

References

Integers